Camors is a commune in the Morbihan department of Brittany in north-western France.

Geography
The village is situated in the heart of a forest-covered region called the Landes de Lanvaux. With the River Tarun, its main tributary, the Ével forms the commune's northern border. The village centre is surrounded by the forest of Floranges and the national forest of Camors. Apart from the village centre, there are the village of Lambel-Camors and the village of Locoal-Camors and several hamlets.

Demographics
Inhabitants of Camors are called in French Camoriens.

Map

History

In the past, the inhabitants lived off the resources of the forest; they were clog makers, charcoal makers, sawyers, woodcutters...The last clogmaker in Morbihan lived in Camors.

Points of interest
Arboretum de Camors

See also
Communes of the Morbihan department

References

External links

Official site 

 Mayors of Morbihan Association 

Communes of Morbihan